India participated at the 2018 Asian Para Games which was held in Jakarta, Indonesia from 6 to 13 October 2018.

Competitors 
The Paralympic Committee of India sent its largest ever contingent of 190 athletes for the Games.

Medalists 

| style="text-align:left; vertical-align:top;"|

|  style="text-align:left; vertical-align:top;"|

|

Archery

Recurve

Compound

Badminton

Men

Women

Mixed

Boccia

Men

Chess

VI - B1

VI - B2/B3

P1

Cycling 

Men

Judo

Men

Women 
Knockout format

Round Robin format

Para Athletics

Men

Track

Field

Women

Track

Field

Para Powerlifting

Men

Women

Para Swimming

Men

Women

Para Shooting

Men

Women

Table Tennis 

Singles

Doubles

Tenpin Bowling 

Men

Wheelchair Fencing

Men Individual

Men Team

See also
 India at the 2018 Asian Games

References

Nations at the 2018 Asian Para Games
India at the Asian Para Games
2018 in Indian sport